This list of University of Chicago Law School alumni consists of notable people who graduated or attended the University of Chicago Law School. The law school has produced many distinguished alumni in the judiciary, government and politics, academia, and business, and other fields. Its alumni include heads of state and politicians around the world, the Lord Chief Justice of England and Wales, the President of the Supreme Court of Israel, judges of United States Courts of Appeals, several U.S. Attorneys General and Solicitors General, members of Congress and cabinet officials, Privy Counsellors, university presidents and faculty deans, founders of the law firms Kirkland & Ellis, Baker McKenzie, and Jenner & Block, CEOs and chairpersons of multinational corporations, and contributors to literature, journalism, and the arts. The law school counts among its alumni recipients of the Presidential Medal of Freedom, Fulbright Scholars, Rhodes Scholars, Marshall Scholars, Commonwealth Fellows, National Humanities Medallists, and Pulitzer Prize winners.

Classes at the law school started in 1902. All degrees listed below are Juris Doctor (J.D.), unless noted otherwise.

Law and government

United States government

Executive branch

U.S. Attorneys General
John Ashcroft (1967), 79th U.S. Attorney General (2001–2005)
Ramsey Clark (1950), 66th U.S. Attorney General (1966–1969)
Edward H. Levi (1935), 71st U.S. Attorney General (1975–1977)

U.S. Solicitors General
Robert Bork (1953), 35th U.S. Solicitor General (1973–1977); also Judge of the United States Court of Appeals for the District of Columbia Circuit (1982–1988)
Noel Francisco (1996), 47th U.S. Solicitor General (2017–2020)
Rex E. Lee (1963), 37th U.S. Solicitor General (1981–1985); also president of Brigham Young University (1989–1995)

Other cabinet and cabinet-level officials
Mary Azcuenaga (1973), Commissioner of the Federal Trade Commission (1984–1998)
Pat Cipollone (1991), 39th White House Counsel (2018–2021)
James Comey (1985), 7th Director of the Federal Bureau of Investigation (2013–2017); also 31st U.S. Deputy Attorney General (2003–2005)
Douglas M. Costle (1964), Administrator of the Environmental Protection Agency (1977–1981)
Harold L. Ickes (1907), 32nd Secretary of the Interior (1933–1946); also High Commissioner to the Philippines (1942–1945)
Kevin McAleenan (1998), United States Secretary of Homeland Security (2019); also Commissioner of U.S. Customs and Border Protection (2017–2019)
Abner Mikva (1951), 27th White House Counsel (1994–1995); also Judge and later Chief Judge of the U.S. Court of Appeals for the D.C. Circuit (1979–1994); and recipient of Presidential Medal of Freedom (2014)
Lisa Monaco (1997), 39th U.S. Deputy Attorney General (2021–present), 6th U.S. Homeland Security Advisor (2013–2017), and Assistant Attorney General for National Security (2011–2013)
Abraham Ribicoff (1933), 4th Secretary of Health, Education, and Welfare (1961–1962); also U.S. Senator (D-Connecticut) (1963–1981) and 80th Governor of Connecticut (1955–1961)
Eugene Scalia (1990), 28th United States Secretary of Labor (2019–2021)

Legislative branch (U.S. Congress)

Senators
Carol Moseley Braun (1972), U.S. Senator (D-Illinois) (1993–1999); also United States Ambassador to New Zealand (1999–2001) and United States Ambassador to Samoa (2000–2001)
Zales Ecton (1921), U.S. Senator (R-Montana) (1947–1953)
Herbert E. Hitchcock, U.S. Senator (D-South Dakota) (1936–1938)
Roman Hruska (did not graduate), U.S. Senator (R-Nebraska) (1954–1976)
James W. Huffman (1922), U.S. Senator (D-Ohio) (1945–1946)
Amy Klobuchar (1985), U.S. Senator (D-Minnesota) (2006–present)
James P. Pope (1909), U.S. Senator (D-Idaho) (1933–1939); also 35th Mayor of Boise, Idaho (1929–1933)
Abraham Ribicoff (1933), U.S. Senator (D-Connecticut) (1963–1981); also 4th Secretary of Health, Education, and Welfare (1961–1962) and 80th Governor of Connecticut (1955–1961)
David W. Stewart (1917), U.S. Senator (R-Iowa) (1926–1927)
Jim Talent (1981), U.S. Senator (R-Missouri) (2002–2007)

Representatives
John B. Bennett (1926), U.S. Representative (R-Michigan) (1943–1945, 1947–1964)
Albert M. Cole (1925), U.S. Representative (R-Kansas) (1945–1953)
Elizabeth Cheney (1996), U.S. Representative (R-Wyoming) (2017–present) and Chair of the House Republican Conference (2019–2021)
James I. Dolliver (1921), U.S. Representative (R-Iowa) (1945–1957)
Edward C. Eicher (1906), U.S. Representative (D-Iowa)(1933–1938); also Chief Justice of the U.S. District Court for the District of Columbia (1942–1944)
Charles N. Fowler (1878), U.S. Representative (R-New Jersey) (1895–1911)
Edgar A. Jonas (1910), U.S. Representative (R-Illinois) (1949–1955)
David M. McIntosh (1983), U.S. Representative (R-Indiana) (1995–2001)
David Minge (1967), U.S. Representative (D-Minnesota) (1993–2001); also Judge of the Minnesota Court of Appeals (2002–2012)
Patsy Mink (1951), U.S. Representative (D-Hawaii) (1965–1971, 1990–2002) and recipient of Presidential Medal of Freedom (2014)
Samuel J. Nicholls (1909), U.S. Representative (D-South Carolina) (1915–1921)
Kathryn O'Loughlin McCarthy (1920), U.S. Representative (D-Kansas) (1933–1935)
John Pickler (1871), U.S. Representative (R-South Dakota) (1889–1897)
Jessie Sumner (1923), U.S. Representative (R-Illinois) (1939–1947)
J. W. Robinson (1912), U.S. Representative (D-Utah) (1933–1947)
Sidney R. Yates (1933), U.S. Representative (D-Illinois (1949–1963, 1965–1999)

Judicial branch

Federal courts of appeals
Danny Julian Boggs (1968), Judge and formerly Chief Judge of the U.S. Court of Appeals for the Sixth Circuit (1986–present)
Frank H. Easterbrook (1973), Judge and formerly Chief Judge of the U.S. Court of Appeals for the Seventh Circuit (1985–present)
Allison H. Eid (1991), Judge of the U.S. Court of Appeals for the Tenth Circuit (2017–present); also Associate Justice of the Colorado Supreme Court (2006–2017)
Florence E. Allen (did not graduate), Judge and later Chief Judge of the U.S. Court of Appeals for the Sixth Circuit (1934–1966); also Associate Justice of the Ohio Supreme Court (1923–1934)
Philip J. Finnegan (1913), Judge of the U.S. Court of Appeals for the Seventh Circuit (1949–1959)
Jerome Frank (1912), Judge of U.S. Court of Appeals for the Second Circuit (1941–1957); Chairman of the Securities and Exchange Commission (1939–1941); and leading figure in the legal realism movement
Douglas H. Ginsburg (1973), Judge and formerly Chief Judge of the U.S. Court of Appeals for the D.C. Circuit (1986–present)
James C. Ho (1999), Judge of the U.S. Court of Appeals for the Fifth Circuit (2018–present); also 4th Solicitor General of Texas (2008–2010)
Michael W. McConnell (1979), Judge of the U.S. Court of Appeals for the Tenth Circuit (2002–2009), also professor at Stanford Law School
George Thomas McDermott (1909), Judge of the U.S. Court of Appeals for the Tenth Circuit (1929–1937)
Monroe G. McKay (1960), Judge and formerly Chief Judge of the U.S. Court of Appeals for the Tenth Circuit (1977–2020)
Abner Mikva (1951), Judge and Chief Judge of the U.S. Court of Appeals for the D.C. Circuit (1979-1994); recipient of Presidential Medal of Freedom (2014)
Eric D. Miller (1999), Judge of the U.S. Court of Appeals for the Ninth Circuit (2019–present)
Eric E. Murphy (2005), Judge of the U.S. Court of Appeals for the Sixth Circuit (2018–present); also 9th Solicitor General of Ohio (2013–2017)
Walter Lyndon Pope (1912), Judge and later Chief Judge of the U.S. Court of Appeals for the Ninth Circuit (1949–1969)
Neomi Rao (1999), Judge of the U.S. Court of Appeals for the District of Columbia Circuit (2019–present); also administrator of the Office of Information and Regulatory Affairs (2017–2019)
Julius N. Richardson (2003), Judge of the U.S. Court of Appeals for the Fourth Circuit (2018–present)
Beth Robinson (1989), Judge of the U.S. Court of Appeals for the Second Circuit (2021–present); also Associate Justice of the Vermont Supreme Court (2011–2021) 
Elmer Jacob Schnackenberg (1912), Judge of the U.S. Court of Appeals for the Seventh Circuit (1954–1968)
Mary M. Schroeder (1965), Judge and formerly Chief Judge of the U.S. Court of Appeals for the Ninth Circuit (1979–2011)
Milan Smith (1969), Judge of the U.S. Court of Appeals for the Ninth Circuit (2006–present)
Hardress Nathaniel Swaim (1916), Judge of the U.S. Court of Appeals for the Seventh Circuit (1950–1957); also Justice of the Indiana Supreme Court (1939–1945)
David S. Tatel (1966), Judge of the U.S. Court of Appeals for the D.C. Circuit (1994–present)

Federal district courts
Richard B. Austin (1926), Judge of the U.S. District Court for the Northern District of Illinois (1961–1977)
Axel J. Beck (1922), Judge and later Chief Judge of the U.S. District Court for the District of South Dakota (1958–1981)
Morton A. Brody (1958), Judge of the U.S. District Court for the District of Maine (1991–2000)
Douglas R. Cole (1993), Judge of the U.S. District Court for the Southern District of Ohio (2019–present); also 5th Solicitor General of Ohio (2003–2006)
Edward C. Eicher (1906), Chief Justice of the U.S. District Court for the District of Columbia (1942–1944); also U.S. Representative (D-Iowa)(1933–1938)
Roger Thomas Foley (1910), Judge and later Chief Judge of the U.S. District Court for the District of Nevada (1945–1974)
Paul Grewal (1996), Magistrate Judge of the U.S. District Court for the Northern District of California (2010–2016); chief legal officer at Coinbase (2020–present)
Terry J. Hatter Jr. (1960),  Judge and formerly Chief Judge of the U.S. District Court for the Central District of California (1979–present)
William Charles Lee (1962), Judge and previously Chief Judge of the U.S. District Court for the Northern District of Indiana (1981–present)
Harry Leinenweber (1962), Judge of the U.S. District Court for the Northern District of Illinois (1985–present)
William J. Martínez (1980), Judge of the U.S. District Court for the District of Colorado (2010–present)
Claude C. McColloch (1909), Judge and later Chief Judge of the U.S. District Court for the District of Oregon (1937–1959)
Peter Jo Messitte (1966), Judge of the U.S. District Court for the District of Maryland (2008–present)
Robert Dale Morgan (1937), Judge and later Chief Judge of the U.S. District Court for the Central District of Illinois (1979–2002) and Judge and later Chief Judge of the U.S. District Court for the Southern District of Illinois (1967–1979)
Walker David Miller (LL.M. 1965), Judge of the U.S. District Court for the District of Colorado (1996–2013)
Alexander J. Napoli (1929), Judge of the U.S. District Court for the Northern District of Illinois (1966–1972)
Carl J. Nichols (1996), Judge of the U.S. District Court for the District of Columbia (2019–present)
Howard C. Nielson Jr. (1997), Judge of the U.S. District Court for the District of Utah (2019–present)
Martha M. Pacold (2002), Judge of the U.S. District Court for the Northern District of Illinois (2019–present)
Rebecca R. Pallmeyer (1979), Chief Judge of the U.S. District Court for the Northern District of Illinois (1998–present)
Barrington D. Parker (1947), Judge of the U.S. District Court for the District of Columbia (1969–1993)
James Benton Parsons (1949), Judge of the U.S. District Court for the Northern District of Illinois (1961–1993); also first African-American to serve as a United States federal judge
Joseph Sam Perry (1927), Judge of U.S. District Court for the Northern District of Illinois (1951–1984)
Casper Platt (1916), Judge and formerly Chief Judge of the U.S. District Court for the Eastern District of Illinois (1949–1965)
Cheryl Pollak (1978), Chief Magistrate of the U.S. District Court for the Eastern District of New York (1995–present)
Willis William Ritter (1924), Judge and later Chief Judge of the U.S. District Court for the District of Utah (1950–1978)
Lee H. Rosenthal (1977), Judge and currently Chief Judge of the U.S. District Court for the Southern District of Texas (1992–present)
Mary M. Rowland (1988), Judge of the U.S. District Court for the Northern District of Illinois (2019–present); also former Magistrate Judge of the same court (2012–2019)
Milton Shadur (1949), Judge of the U.S. District Court for the Northern District of Illinois (1980–2018)
Manish S. Shah (1998), Judge of the U.S. District Court for the Northern District of Illinois (2014–present)
Herbert Jay Stern (1961), Judge of the U.S. District Court for the District of New Jersey (1973–1987) and Judge of the United States Court for Berlin (1979)
Hubert Louis Will (1937), Judge of the U.S. District Court for the Northern District of Illinois (1961–1995)
George H. Wu (1975), Judge of the U.S. District Court for the Central District of California (2007–present)

Other federal courts
Arnold R. Baar (1914), Judge of the U.S. Tax Court (1954)
Renato Beghe (1954), Judge of the U.S. Tax Court (1991–2003)
Richard Hertling (1985), Judge of the U.S. Court of Federal Claims (2019–present)
Mark V. Holmes (1983), Judge of the U.S. Tax Court (2003–present)
Christopher M. Klein, Judge of the Bankruptcy Court for the Eastern District of California (1988–present)
J. Warren Madden (1914), Judge of the United States Court of Claims (1941–1961); also chair of the National Labor Relations Board (1935–1940) and Medal of Freedom recipient (1947)
Irvin Charles Mollison (1923), Judge of the United States Customs Court (1945–1962)
Richard T. Morrison (1993), Judge of the U.S. Tax Court (2008–present)
Allin H. Pierce (1923), Judge of the U.S. Tax Court (1955–1967)
Stephen S. Schwartz (2008), Judge of the U.S. Court of Federal Claims (2020–present)
Christopher S. Sontchi (1992), Judge and formerly Chief Judge of the U.S. Bankruptcy Court for the District of Delaware (2006-present)

State government

Governors
Tony Earl (1961), 41st Governor of Wisconsin (1983–1987)
Dwight H. Green (1922), 30th Governor of Illinois (1941–1949)
A. W. Norblad (1902), 19th Governor of Oregon (1929–1931)
Abraham Ribicoff (1933), 80th Governor of Connecticut (1955–1961); also 4th Secretary of Health, Education, and Welfare (1961–1962) and U.S. Senator (D-Connecticut) (1963–1981)
Ingram Stainback, 9th Governor of Hawaii (1942–1951)
Matthew E. Welsh (1937), 41st Governor of Indiana (1961–1965)

State politicians
Miriam Balanoff (1963), member of the Illinois House of Representatives (1979–1983); also Judge of the Circuit Court of Cook County, Illinois (1986–2000)
Paul Berch (1970), member of the New Hampshire House of Representatives (2012–present)
Jeanne Bodfish, 31st Comptroller of the Treasury of Tennessee (1953–1955)
Jack E. Bowers, member of the Illinois House of Representatives (1965–1967) and of the Illinois Senate (1977–1983)
John C. Brooks, North Carolina Commissioner of Labor (1977–1993)
Allen Busby (1928), member of the Wisconsin State Senate (1936–1972)
Clarence C. Caldwell (did not graduate), 9th Attorney General of South Dakota (1915–1919)
John E. Cashman, member of the Wisconsin State Senate (1923–1938, 1941–1946)
John William Chapman (1917), 37th Lieutenant Governor of Illinois (1953–1961)
Lycurgus Conner, member of the Illinois House of Representatives (1961–1963)
Robert E. Coulson (1937), member of the Illinois House of Representatives (1957–1962) and member of the Illinois Senate (1963–1973)
Richard W. DeKorte (1959), member of the New Jersey General Assembly (1967–1970)
Peter Diamondstone (1960), co-founder of the Liberty Union Party
Leif Erickson (1934), chair of the Montana Democratic Party (1956–1958); also Justice of the Montana Supreme Court (1939–1945)
Thurlow Essington (1908), member of the Illinois Senate (1919–1927)
Benjamin M. Flowers (2012), 10th Solicitor General of Ohio (2019–present)
John A. Gale (1965), 26th Secretary of State of Nebraska (2000–2019)
Don Harmon (1994), 39th president of the Illinois Senate (2021–present) and member of the Illinois Senate (2003–present)
Mike Hilgers (2004), member of the Nebraska Legislature (2017–present)
Sue Metzger Dickey Hough (1906), member of the Minnesota House of Representatives (1923–1924)
F. Badger Ives (did not graduate), member of the Wisconsin State Assembly (1899–1914)
Anthony Johnstone (1999), Solicitor General of Montana (2008–2011); current nominee for Judge of the U.S. Court of Appeals for the Ninth Circuit
Nathan J. Kaplan, member of the Illinois House of Representatives (1956–1962)
Alexandra Kasser (2003), member of the Connecticut State Senate (2019–2021)
Harold A. Katz (1948), member of the Illinois House of Representatives (1965–1982)
Mary Anne Krupsak (1962), 80th Lieutenant Governor of New York (1975–1978)
Dan Liljenquist (2001), member of the Utah State Senate (2009–2011)
Arthur C. Lueder, Illinois Auditor of Public Accounts (1941–1949)
Rob McKenna (1988), 17th Attorney General of Washington (2005–2013)
George D. Mills (1923), member of the Illinois Senate (1943–1948)
Jonathan Mitchell (2001), 5th Solicitor General of Texas (2010–2015)
Lewis V. Morgan (1954), member of the Illinois House of Representatives (1963–1970)
Eric E. Murphy, 9th Solicitor General of Ohio (2013–2017); also Judge of the U.S. Court of Appeals for the Sixth Circuit
Chris Nybo, member of the Illinois Senate (2014–2018) and member of the Illinois House of Representatives (2011–2013)
Myron Orfield, (1987), member of the Minnesota Senate (2000-2002) and member of the Minnesota House of Representatives (2000-2002); also professor at the University of Minnesota Law School
Gertrude Polcar (1938), member of the Ohio House of Representatives (1969–1971)
James Reilly (1972) member of the Illinois House of Representatives (1976–1978) 
Jesse Ruiz (1995), Deputy Governor of Illinois for Education (2011–present) and chairman of the Illinois State Board of Education (2004–2011)
J. Clinton Searle (1913), member of the Illinois House of Representatives (1927–37, 1939–1952)
Ken Simpler, State Treasurer of Delaware (2015–2019)
Michele Smith (1979), member of the Chicago City Council (2011–present)
Zack Stephenson (2010), member of the Minnesota House of Representatives (2019–present)
Anton D. Strouf (1910), member of the Montana Senate (1920)
Calvin Sutker (1950), member of the Illinois House of Representatives (1985–1991) and member of the Cook County Board of Commissioners (1994–2002)
William Tong (2000), 25th Attorney General of Connecticut (2019–present) and member of the Connecticut House of Representatives (2007–present)
A. Andrew Torrence, member of the Illinois House of Representatives (1939–1940)
Mark Tremmel, member of the Iowa House of Representatives (2001–2003)
Edward Vrdolyak (1963), member and later president of the Chicago City Council (1971–1987)
Bill Witt (1976), member of the Oregon House of Representatives (1999–2003)
Rob Witwer (1996), member of the Colorado House of Representatives (2005–2009)
Tremaine Wright (1999), member of the New York State Assembly (2017–2021)

State judges
Donald G. Alexander, Justice of the Maine Supreme Judicial Court (1998–2020)
Norman Arterburn (1926) Justice of the Indiana Supreme Court (1955-1977)
Miriam Balanoff (1963), Judge of the Circuit Court of Cook County, Illinois (1986–2000); also member of the Illinois House of Representatives (1979–1983)
Thomas A. Balmer (1977), Associate Justice and formerly Chief Justice of the Oregon Supreme Court (2001–present)
Richard Bandstra (1980), Judge of the Michigan Court of Appeals (1995–2011); also member of the Michigan House of Representatives (1985–1994)
Tim Bradbury (1972), Judge of the King County Superior Court (1995)
William H. Bright Jr. (1987), Chief Judge of the Connecticut Appellate Court (2017–present)
Daniel Calabretta (2003), Judge of the Sacramento County Superior Court (2019–present); current nominee for Judge of the U.S. District Court for the Eastern District of California
William C. Christianson (1920), Associate Justice of the Minnesota Supreme Court (1946); also judge of the Nuremberg Military Tribunals (1948–1949)
Charles H. Davis (1931), Justice and later Chief Justice of the Illinois Supreme Court (1955–1960) and Justice and two-time Presiding Justice of the Illinois Appellate Court (1964–1970)
Leif Erickson (1934), Justice of the Montana Supreme Court (1939–1945); also chair of the Montana Democratic Party (1956–1958)
Hugo Friend (1908), Judge of the Circuit Court of Cook County, Illinois (1920–1966)
Christopher L. Garrett (2000), Associate Justice of the Oregon Supreme Court (2019–present)
Luther Marcellus Goddard (1864), Justice of the Colorado Supreme Court (1891–1901, 1905–1909)
E. Harold Hallows (1930), Justice and later Chief Justice of the Wisconsin Supreme Court (1958–1974)
Harry B. Hershey (1911), Justice of the Illinois Supreme Court (1951–1966)
Constandinos Himonas (1989), Associate Justice of the Utah Supreme Court (2015–present)
George M. Joseph (1955), Chief Judge of the Oregon Court of Appeals (1981–1992)
Warren Jones (1968), Justice of the Idaho Supreme Court (2007–2017)
Scott L. Kafker (1985), Associate Justice of the Massachusetts Supreme Judicial Court (2017–present) and of the Massachusetts Appeals Court (2001–2017)
Thomas E. Kluczynski (1927), Justice of the Illinois Supreme Court (1966–1976, 1978–1980)
Thomas Rex Lee (1991), Associate Justice of the Utah Supreme Court (2010–present)
Raymond B. Lucas (1915), Justice of the Supreme Court of Missouri (1938)
David Minge (1967), Judge of the Minnesota Court of Appeals (2002–2012); also member of the U.S. Representative (D-Minnesota) (1993–2001)
Edward Nakamura (1951), Justice of the Supreme Court of Hawaii (1980–1989)
Lisa Neubauer (1987), Judge and currently Chief Judge of the Wisconsin Court of Appeals (2007–present)
Jack O'Malley (1981), Judge on the second district of the Illinois Appellate Court (2000–2010)
Susan Phillips Read (1972), Judge of the New York Court of Appeals (2003–2015)
Mark E. Recktenwald (1986), Chief Justice of the Supreme Court of Hawaii (2010–present)
Philip L. Rice (1916), Justice of the Territorial Supreme Court of Hawaii (1955–1959)
Frank Richman (1908), Justice of the Indiana Supreme Court (1941-1947), judge at the Nuremberg trials
John W. Rogers Sr. (1948), former Cook County, Illinois Juvenile Court Judge, and U.S. Air Force officer with the Tuskegee Airmen
George Rossman (1910), Associate Justice and later Chief Justice of the Oregon Supreme Court (1927–1965)
Walter V. Schaefer, Justice of the Illinois Supreme Court (1951–1976)
Hardress Nathaniel Swaim (1916), Justice of the Indiana Supreme Court (1939–1945); also Judge of the U.S. Court of Appeals for the Seventh Circuit (1950–1957)
Paul Thissen (1992), Associate Justice of the Minnesota Supreme Court (2018–present); also 59th Speaker of the Minnesota House of Representatives (2013–2015)
Wilfred Tsukiyama, Justice and later Chief Justice of the Supreme Court of Hawaii (1959-1965)
Lester A. Wade (1917), Justice and later Chief Justice of the Utah Supreme Court (1943–1966)
Dale Wainwright (1988), Associate Justice of the Supreme Court of Texas (2003–2012)

City government
Andy Berke (1994), 73rd Mayor of Chattanooga (2013–present) and member of the Tennessee Senate (2007–2012)
Solomon Gutstein (1956), first ordained Rabbi to serve as alderman on the Chicago City Council (1975–1979) and leading practitioner on Illinois real estate law
Hugh Hallman (1988), Mayor of Tempe, Arizona (2004–2012)
David H. Hoffman (1995), inspector-general of Chicago (2005–2009), partner of Sidley Austin and lecturer at the law school
Susheela Jayapal (1988), Multnomah County Commissioner (2019–present)
Lori Lightfoot (1989), 47th Mayor of Chicago (2019–present)
Mary V. Mochary (1967), 9th Mayor of Montclair (1980–1984)
Watkins Overton (1921), 42nd and longest-serving Mayor of Memphis, Tennessee (1928–1939)
James P. Pope (1909), 35th Mayor of Boise, Idaho (1929–1933); also U.S. Senator (D-Idaho) (1933–1939)
Nancy Rodkin Rotering (1990), Mayor of Highland Park, Illinois (2011-present)
Carol Ruth Silver (1964), member of San Francisco Board of Supervisors (1978–1980); also civil rights activist and Freedom Rider

U.S. diplomatic figures
Donald C. Bergus (1940), U.S. Ambassador to Sudan (1977–1980)
Richard Wayne Bogosian (1962), U.S. Ambassador to Niger (1985–1988)and U.S. Ambassador to Chad (1990–1993)
Carol Moseley Braun (1972), U.S. Ambassador to New Zealand (1999–2001) and U.S. Ambassador to Samoa (2000–2001); also U.S. Senator (D-Illinois) (1993–1999)
John B. Emerson (1978), U.S. Ambassador to Germany (2013–2017)
Mary Ann Glendon (J.D. 1961, M.C.L 1963), U.S. Ambassador to the Holy See (2008–2009); also professor at Harvard Law School
James Hormel (1958), 17th U.S. Ambassador to Luxembourg (1998–2001)

Other U.S. political figures
Mala Adiga (2002), Policy Director to the Second Lady of the U.S., Jill Biden (2021–present)
Cyrus Amir-Mokri (1995), Assistant Secretary for Financial Institutions at the U.S. Treasury Department (2011–2014); also general counsel and managing director at JPMorgan Chase
Greg Andres, Assistant Special Counsel for Russian interference in 2016 United States elections (2017); also partner at Davis Polk & Wardwell
Brian P. Brooks, acting Comptroller of the Currency (2020–present)
Lisa Brown (1986), White House Staff Secretary (2009–2011), also chief legal counsel to Georgetown University (2013–present)
William Holmes Brown (1954), Parliamentarian of the U.S. House of Representatives (1974–1994)
Mary Ellen Callahan (1997), Chief Privacy Officer and Chief Freedom of Information Act Officer of the U.S. Department of Homeland Security (2009–2012)
 Benton J. Campbell (1991), U.S. Attorney for the Eastern District of New York (2007–2010); also partner of Latham & Watkins
Henry P. Chandler (1906), director of the Administrative Office of the United States Courts (1939–1956)
Benjamin V. Cohen (1915), advisor and member of the administrations of Presidents Franklin D. Roosevelt and Harry S. Truman
James Cole Jr. (1995), acting Deputy Secretary of Education (2016–2017)
D. Leigh Colvin, chairman of the Prohibition Party (1926–1932)
Sean J. Cooksey (2014), Commissioner of the Federal Election Commission (2020–present)
Richard Cordray (1986), 1st Director of the Consumer Financial Protection Bureau (2012–2017); also 49th Attorney General of Ohio (2009–2011),  46th Treasurer of Ohio (2007–2009) and Solicitor General of Ohio (1993–1995)
Roger C. Cramton (1955), chairman of the Administrative Conference of the United States (1970–1972) and assistant U.S. attorney general (1972–1973); also dean of Cornell Law School (1973–1980)
Kenneth W. Dam (1957), 8th U.S. Deputy Secretary of State (1982–1985); also U.S. Deputy Secretary of the Treasury (2001–2003), current senior fellow of the Brookings Institution and the Max Pam Professor Emeritus of American & Foreign Law at the law school
Ashley Deeks (1998), associate White House Counsel and deputy legal adviser to U.S. National Security Council (2021–present); also professor at University of Virginia School of Law
Isaiah Sol Dorfman (1931), agent of the Office of Strategic Services and labor lawyer
Jon Dudas, Director of the U.S. Patent and Trademark Office (2004–2009)
Gary Edson (1982), Deputy National Security Advisor (2001–2004)
Troy Eid (1991), U.S. Attorney for the District of Colorado (2006–2009)
Curtis E. Gannon (1998), Principal Deputy Assistant Attorney General for the Office of Legal Counsel (2017–present)
Jessica Hertz (2007), White House Staff Secretary (2021–present)
Rachael A. Honig (1999), acting United States Attorney for the District of New Jersey (2018–present)
John Alvin Johnson (1940), General Counsel of the Air Force (1952–1958) and general counsel of NASA (1958–1963)
David A. Kessler (1977), co-chair of the COVID-19 Advisory Board (2020–present); 17th Commissioner of Food and Drugs (1990–1997); dean of the Yale School of Medicine (1997–2003) and dean of the University of California, San Francisco Medical School (2003–2007)
Wan J. Kim (1993), Assistant U.S. Attorney General for the Civil Rights Division in the Department of Justice (2005–2007)
David Ladd (1953), 10th Register of Copyrights (1980–1985) and U.S. Commissioner of Patents (1961–1963)
Jewel Lafontant (1946), Deputy U.S. Solicitor General (1973–1975) and representative to the General Assembly of the United Nations (1972); also first African-American woman to graduate from the law school
Morris I. Leibman (1933), civilian aide-at-large to the U.S. Secretary of the Army (1964–1979), recipient of Presidential Medal of Freedom (1981), and partner of Sidley Austin
Daniel Levin (1953), Deputy Assistant Attorney General for the Office of Legal Counsel (2004–2005)
James A. Lewis (1966), U.S. Attorney for the Central District of Illinois (2010–2016)
Sidney I. Lezak (1949), U.S. Attorney for the District of Oregon (1961–1982)
William P. MacCracken Jr. (1911), first U.S. Assistant Secretary of Commerce for Aeronautics (1926–1942)
Roswell Magill (1920), U.S. Under Secretary of the Treasury (1937–1938); Chief Attorney in the U.S. Treasury Department (1923–1927)
Maureen Mahoney (1978), Deputy U.S. Solicitor General (1991–1992); also partner of Latham & Watkins
William M. Marutani (1953), commissioner on the Commission on Wartime Relocation and Internment of Civilians (1980–1983) 
Scott Milne Matheson Sr., U.S. Attorney for the District of Utah (1949–1953)
Kevin McAleenan (1998), Commissioner of U.S. Customs and Border Protection (2017–2019); also United States Secretary of Homeland Security (2019)
Richard H. Newhouse Jr., member of the Illinois Senate (1967–1991)
Sheila Nix (1989), chief of staff to the Second Lady of the U.S., Jill Biden (2013–2017)
Ajit Pai (1997), Chairman of the Federal Communications Commission (2017–2021)
Margaret Peterlin (2000), Chief of Staff to the U.S. Secretary of State, Rex Tillerson (2017–2018); also senior vice president of global external and public affairs at AT&T (2018–present)
Mythili Raman (1994), acting Assistant Attorney General for the U.S. Department of Justice's Criminal Division (2013–2014); partner of Covington & Burling
Preston Richards, assistant solicitor at the United States Department of State
Kyle Sampson (1996), chief of staff and counselor of U.S. Attorney General Alberto Gonzales (2005–2007)
James Santelle (1993), U.S. Attorney for the Eastern District of Wisconsin (2010–2015)
Hal S. Scott (1972), Director of the Committee on Capital Markets Regulation; also governor of the American Stock Exchange and professor at Harvard Law School (1975–present)
Melanie Sloan (1991), founder and executive director of Citizens for Responsibility and Ethics in Washington and counsel for the House Judiciary Committee
Mary L. Smith (1991), principal deputy director and acting agency head of the Indian Health Service (2015–2017)
Cheryl Stanton (1997), administrator of the Wage and Hour Division at the U.S. Department of Labor (2019–2021) 
Karl R. Thompson (2000), Assistant Attorney General for the Office of Legal Counsel (2014–2017)
Jeff Wall (2003), acting U.S. Solicitor General (2020–2021)
J. Ernest Wilkins Sr., assistant Secretary of Labor (1954–1958)

Non-United States government

Non-United States political figures
 Herman De Croo (1962), President of the Belgian Chamber of Representatives (1999–2007) and longest-serving member of the Belgian Federal Parliament (1991–present)
 Mei Ju-ao (1928), chief of the Chinese Ministry of Justice (1948–1949); also member of judges of the International Military Tribunal for the Far East (1946–1948)
 Alexander Krasnoshchyokov (1912), head of the Far Eastern Republic (1920–1921)
 Hans Jürgen Wildberg (LL.M. 1975), district administrator of Stormarn in Schleswig-Holstein, Germany (1990–1998)
 David Libai (J.S.D. 1968), member of the Knesset (1984–1999) and Israeli Minister of Justice (1992–1996)
 Geoffrey Palmer (1967), 33rd Prime Minister of New Zealand (1989–1990)
 Uriel Reichman (J.S.D. 1975), member of the Knesset (2006); also dean of the Tel Aviv University law faculty (1985–1990) and founder and president of Interdisciplinary Center Herzliya (1994–present)
 Shimon Shetreet (D.C.L. 1973), member of the Knesset (1988–1996)
 Alain Zenner (M.C.L. 1969), member of Parliament of the Brussels-Capital Region (1991–present) and senator (1999–2007)

Non-United States judicial figures
 Shimon Agranat (1929), President of the Supreme Court of Israel (1965–1976)
 Kwamena Bentsi-Enchill, justice of the Supreme Court of Ghana (1971–1972)
 Robert Carswell, Baron Carswell (1958), Lord of Appeal in Ordinary (2004–2009), Lord Chief Justice of Northern Ireland (1997–2004), Lord Justice of Appeal of the Supreme Court of Judicature of Northern Ireland (1993–1997)
 Lord Thomas of Cwmgiedd (1970), Lord Chief Justice of England and Wales (2013–2017)

Notable attorneys
 Frederick B. Abramson (1959), president of the District of Columbia Bar (1985–1986)
 Katherine L. Adams (1990), general counsel of Apple Inc. (2017–present)
 Richard Baker (1955), founder of Baker McKenzie
 Robert Barnett (1971), partner of Williams & Connolly
 Laird Bell, philanthropist, attorney and co-founder of Bell, Boyd & Lloyd LLP, now K&L Gates
 Steve Berman (1980), leading class actions attorney and managing partner of Hagens Berman Sobol Shapiro
 Frank Cicero Jr. (1965), partner of Kirkland & Ellis
 Patrick M. Collins, partner of King & Spalding
 Roberta Cooper Ramo (1967), first female president of the American Law Institute (1995–1996) and first female president of the American Bar Association (2008–2017)
 Earl B. Dickerson (1920), prominent attorney and community activist and first African-American graduate of the law school
 Howard Ellis (J.D. 1914, LL.D. 1915), name partner of Kirkland & Ellis
 Bruce Ennis (1965), founder of the law firm Ennis, Friedman, Bersoff & Ewing, which merged into Jenner & Block
 Ted Frank (1994), leading class actions attorney and founder and president of the Center for Class Action Fairness
 Edward de Grazia (1951), attorney involved in numerous high-profile cases of literary and artistic censorship in the 1960s; also founding member of faculty at the Benjamin N. Cardozo School of Law
 Paul Grewal (1996), chief legal officer at Coinbase (2020–present); Magistrate Judge of the U.S. District Court for the Northern District of California (2010–2016)
 Chris Hansen, civil rights attorney, notable for litigating U.S. Supreme Court cases AMP v. Myriad Genetics and ACLU v. Reno
 Gregory Jacob (1999), partner of O'Melveny & Myers
 Brooke Jenkins (2006), District Attorney of San Francisco (2022–present)
 Lillian Johnson (1975), civil justice advocate and director of National Legal Aid & Defender Association
 Leon L. Lewis (1913), inaugural national secretary of the Anti-Defamation League
 Carl J. Mayer, founder of the Mayer Law Group LLC 
 Bernard D. Meltzer (1937), prosecutor at the Nuremberg trials and a drafter of the U.N. Charter; also professor at the law school and leading scholar of labor law
 Marla Messing (1986), attorney, sports executive and CEO of organising committee of the 1999 FIFA Women's World Cup
 Susan M. Moss (1994), partner of Chemtob Moss Forman & Beyda LLP
 Francis Neate (1963), president of the International Bar Association (2005–2006); also English cricketer (1958–1979)
 Frederick M. Nicholas (1952), attorney specializing in real estate and property development
 Roderick A. Palmore (1977), general counsel and executive vice-president of Sara Lee Corporation (1996–2008) and of General Mills (2008–present)
 Matthew Parish (LL.M. 2004, J.S.D. 2007), managing partner of Gentium Law Group
 Gerald Ratner (1937), co-founder of Gould & Ratner
 Eugene Scalia (1990), partner of Gibson, Dunn & Crutcher
 Harry Schneider (1979), partner of Perkins Coie
 William Spade (1990), noted criminal defense attorney in Philadelphia, Pennsylvania
 Fay Stender (1956), attorney and representative of Black Panther leader Huey Newton, the Soledad Brothers and Black Guerrilla Family founder George Jackson
 Jean Stoffregen (did not graduate), racial equality lawyer for the Fellowship of Reconciliation
 Ted Ullyot (1994), partner of Andreessen Horowitz and former general counsel of Facebook
 Sam Yasgur (1966), assistant district attorney of New York and leading prosecutor

Academia

University presidents
 Morris B. Abram (1940), president of Brandeis University (1968–1970)
 William Birenbaum (1946), president of Antioch College (1976–1985)
 King Virgil Cheek (1969), president of Shaw University (1969–1971) and of Morgan State University (1971–1974)
 Arland F. Christ-Janer (1952), president of Cornell College (1962–1967), of Boston University (1967–1970), of New College of Florida (1973–1975), of Stephens College (1975–1983), and of the Ringling School of Art and Design (1984–1996)
 Lewis Collens (1966), president of Illinois Institute of Technology (1990–2007) and dean of Chicago-Kent College of Law (1974–1990)
 Christopher L. Eisgruber (1988), president of Princeton University (2013–present)
 Rex E. Lee (1963), president of Brigham Young University (1989–1995); also 37th U.S. Solicitor General (1981–1985)
 Dallin H. Oaks (1957), president of Brigham Young University (1971–1980); also First Counselor in the First Presidency (LDS Church) (2018–present)
 Barbara Snyder (1980), president of Case Western Reserve University (2007–present) and president of Association of American Universities (2020–present)

Deans
 Alfred Avins (J.S.D. 1962), dean and co-founder of the Delaware Law School (1971–1974)
 Alfred C. Aman, Jr. (1970), dean of Indiana University School of Law (1991–2002) and Suffolk University Law School (2007–2009)
 Craig M. Boise (1994), dean of Cleveland-Marshall College of Law (2011–2016) and of Syracuse University College of Law (2016–present)
 Roger C. Cramton (1955), dean of Cornell Law School (1973–1980); also chairman of the Administrative Conference of the United States (1970–1972) and assistant U.S. attorney general (1972–1973)
 John C. Eastman (1995), dean of the Chapman University School of Law (2007–2010)
 Ward Farnsworth (1994), dean of University of Texas School of Law (2012–present)
 William Ray Forrester (1935), dean of Vanderbilt University Law School (1949–1952), Tulane University Law School (1952–1963) and Cornell Law School (1963–1973)
 Jim Huffman (1972), dean of Lewis & Clark Law School (1994–2006) and the Republican nominee in the 2010 U.S. Senate election in Oregon
 Herma Hill Kay (1959), dean of UC Berkeley School of Law (1992–2000)
 David A. Kessler (1977), dean of the Yale School of Medicine (1997–2003) and the University of California, San Francisco Medical School (2003–2007); also co-chair of the COVID-19 Advisory Board (2020–present) and 17th Commissioner of Food and Drugs (1990–1997)
 Larry Kramer (1984), dean of Stanford Law School (2004–2012); also president of the Hewlett Foundation
 William H. Leary (1908), dean of the University of Utah College of Law (1915–1950)
 Henry Manne (1952), dean emeritus of the George Mason University School of Law (1986–1996)
 Robert K. Rasmussen (1985), dean of the Gould School of Law at the University of Southern California (2007–2015)
 Uriel Reichman (J.S.D. 1975), dean of the Tel Aviv University law faculty (1985–1990) and founder and president of Interdisciplinary Center Herzliya (1994–present); also member of the Knesset (2006)
 Peter B. Rutledge (1996), dean of University of Georgia School of Law (2015–present)
 D. Gordon Smith (1990), dean of the J. Reuben Clark Law School at Brigham Young University (2016–present)
 Geoffrey R. Stone (1971), dean (1987–1994) and interim dean (2015) of the law school; Edward H. Levi Distinguished Service Professor of Law at the law school; leading First Amendment scholar
 Julian Waterman (1923), founder and inaugural dean of the University of Arkansas School of Law (1926–1943) and vice president of the University of Arkansas (1937–1943)

Professors

Legal
 Norman Abrams (1955), professor emeritus at the UCLA School of Law
 Barry Adler (1985), professor at the New York University School of Law and expert on bankruptcy law
 George Anastaplo (1951), professor at Loyola University Chicago School of Law
 Carlton Bailey (1972), professor at the University of Arkansas School of Law
 Avi Bell (1993), professor at the University of San Diego and at Bar-Ilan University and property law scholar
 Thomas Berg, professor at the  University of St. Thomas
 Vincent Blasi (1967), professor at Columbia Law School and First Amendment scholar and historian
 Walter J. Blum (1941), professor at the law school and pre-eminent figure in tax law
 Dale Carpenter (1959), professor at SMU Dedman School of Law
 Anthony J. Casey (2002), professor at the law school and expert on business law and bankruptcy law
 Marvin Chirelstein (1953), professor at Columbia Law School and at Yale Law School
 Robert N. Clinton (1971), professor at the Sandra Day O'Connor College of Law at Arizona State University
 Dennis Crouch (2003), associate professor at the University of Missouri School of Law
 Martha Davis (1983), professor at Northeastern University
 John F. Duffy, professor at the University of Virginia School of Law
 Andreas Engert (LL.M. 2000), professor at the Free University of Berlin
 Martha Field (1968), professor at Harvard Law School
 Martha Albertson Fineman (1975), professor at Emory University School of Law, scholar of feminist legal theory and critical legal theory, and founder and director of the Feminism and Legal Theory Project
 James Fleissner (1986), professor at the Walter F. George School of Law of Mercer University
 George P. Fletcher (1964), professor at Columbia Law School
 James Friedman, professor at the University of Maine School of Law
 Lawrence M. Friedman (J.D. 1951, LL.M. 1953), professor at Stanford Law School and scholar on American legal history
 Scott Gaille (1995), lecturer at the law school (2013–present) and energy law scholar
 Marc Galanter, professor emeritus at University of Wisconsin School of Law and scholar on law and society
 Stephen Gard (LL.M. 1975), professor at Cleveland-Marshall College of Law
 Roberto Gargarella (LL.M. 1992, J.S.D. 1993), professor at the University of Buenos Aires
 Michael Gerhardt (1982), professor at the UNC School of Law, Special Counsel to the Senate Judiciary Committee for the nominations of Sonia Sotomayor (2009), Elena Kagan (2010), and Neil Gorsuch (2017) to the U.S. Supreme Court
 Jacob Gersen (2004), professor at Harvard Law School
 Mary Ann Glendon (J.D. 1961, M.C.L 1963), professor at Harvard Law School; also U.S. Ambassador to the Holy See (2008–2009)
 Kent Greenfield (1992), professor at the Boston College Law School
 Robert Hamilton (1955), Minerva House Drysdale Regents Chair in Law at the University of Texas School of Law
 Brigitte Haar (1992), professor at Goethe University Frankfurt
 Angela P. Harris (1986), professor at UC Davis School of Law and scholar on critical race theory, feminist legal theory, and criminal law
 John N. Hazard (J.S.D. 1939), professor at Columbia University and scholar on Soviet law
 Paul J. Heald, professor at the University of Illinois College of Law; also novelist
 M. Todd Henderson (1998), Michael J. Marks Professor of Law at the law school and expert on corporate law and securities regulation; also novelist
 Gail Heriot (1981), professor at the University of San Diego School of Law
 William H. J. Hubbard (2000), professor at the law school and expert on civil procedure and law and economics
 Dennis J. Hutchinson (did not graduate), professor at the College of the University of Chicago, senior lecturer at the law school, and editor of the Supreme Court Review
 Zensuke Ishimura (M.C.L. 1964), professor at Tokyo Metropolitan University
 James B. Jacobs (1973), professor at New York University School of Law
 Renee Knake Jefferson (1999), professor and member of the board of trustees at Michigan State University
 Phillip E. Johnson (1965), professor at UC Berkeley School of Law and founder of the intelligent design movement
 Timothy Jost (1975), professor at Washington and Lee University School of Law and expert on American health law and policy
 Harry Kalven, Harry A. Bigelow Professor of Law at the law school and First Amendment scholar
 Michael S. Kang (1999), professor at Northwestern University Pritzker School of Law
 Sonia Katyal (1998), Distinguished Haas Chair at UC Berkeley School of Law
 Leo Katz (1982), professor at the University of Pennsylvania Law School
 Michael Knoll (1984), professor at the University of Pennsylvania Law School
 Eugene Kontorovich (2001), professor at the Antonin Scalia Law School
 Christoph Kumpan (LL.M. 2002), professor at Bucerius Law School
 Thilo Kuntz (LL.M. 2007), professor at Bucerius Law School
 Holning Lau, professor at the University of North Carolina School of Law
 Douglas Laycock (1973), professor at the University of Virginia School of Law and scholar on the law of religious liberty and on remedies
 Hans G. Leser (M.C.L. 1959), professor at University of Marburg and German scholar of private law
 Wesley Liebeler (1957), professor at the University of California and at the Antonin Scalia Law School
 James Lindgren (1977), professor at the Northwestern University Pritzker School of Law
 Tracey Meares (1991), professor at Yale Law School and previously at the Law School; first African-American woman to be granted tenure at both law schools
 Bernard D. Meltzer (1937), leading scholar of labor law and professor at the law school; also prosecutor at the Nuremberg trials and a drafter of the U.N. Charter
 Thomas W. Merrill (1977),  professor at Columbia Law School and leading scholar of constitutional law and administrative law
 William R. Ming (1933), professor at the law school and at Howard University
 Edward R. Morrison (2000), professor at Columbia Law School and leading scholar of bankruptcy and law and economics
 Myron Orfield (1987), professor at the University of Minnesota Law School; also member of the Minnesota Senate (2000-2002) and member of the Minnesota House of Representatives (2000-2002)
 Randal C. Picker (1985), James Parker Hall Distinguished Service Professor of Law at the law school and expert in antitrust law and intellectual property law
 Daniel L. Nagin (1996), clinical professor at Harvard Law School
 Herman Oliphant (1914), professor at the law school and at Columbia Law School, and leading figure in the legal realism movement
 Sol Picciotto, emeritus professor at Lancaster University
 George L. Priest, professor at Yale Law School
 Lucy Reed (1977), director of the Centre for International Law at the National University of Singapore
 Larry Ribstein (1972), professor at George Mason University School of Law and corporate law scholar
 Carol M. Rose (1977), professor at Yale Law School and at the James E. Rogers College of Law at the University of Arizona and property law scholar
 Joseph Sax (1959), professor at UC Berkeley School of Law and at the University of Michigan Law School, environmental law scholar, and developer of the public trust doctrine
 Peter Schlechtriem (M.C.L. 1965), professor at the University of Heidelberg and German legal scholar
 Suzanna Sherry (1979), professor at Vanderbilt University Law School and constitutional law scholar
 Bernard Siegan (1949), professor at the University of San Diego School of Law and libertarian legal theorist
 Robert Sitkoff (1999), professor at Harvard Law School and scholar on trusts and estates
 Barry Sullivan (1974), professor at Loyola University Chicago School of Law
 Franita Tolson (2005), professor at the USC Gould School of Law
 William Twining (1958), professor at University College London and scholar on jurisprudence
 Walter Van Gerven (LL.M. 1960), prominent Belgian lawyer and advocate-general at the European Court of Justice (1988–1994)
 David Vaver (1971), professor at Osgoode Hall Law School and at the University of Oxford
 Gerhard Wagner (LL.M. 1995), professor at the Humboldt University of Berlin
 Stephen Wizner (1963), clinical professor at Yale Law School
 A. N. Yiannopoulos (M.C.L. 1954), professor at Tulane University Law School and founder of the Civil Law Commentaries
 Franklin Zimring (1967), professor at UC Berkeley School of Law and scholar on the criminal justice system

Non-legal
 Nancy Feldman (1946), professor of sociology at the University of Tulsa; also civil rights activist
 Ernst Fraenkel (1941), German political scientist and one of the founding fathers of German political science after World War II
 Cynthia Fuchs Epstein (did not graduate), professor of sociology at the Graduate Center, CUNY
 Jacob T. Levy (LL.M. 2005), professor of political theory at McGill University
 Jack Katz (1969), professor of sociology at the University of California, Los Angeles
 Lorinda Perry, head of political and social sciences department at Rockford College (1914–1916) and professor at University of Illinois (1916–1919)
 David L. Paulsen (1964), professor of philosophy at Brigham Young University
 Robert Redfield (1917), professor at the University of Chicago, anthropologist and ethnolinguist
 Lawrence Rosen (1974), professor at Princeton University and anthropologist
 Ernest Samuels (1926), professor of English at Northwestern University; also biographer and winner of Pulitzer Prize for Biography or Autobiography (1965)
 Winnifred F. Sullivan (1976), professor of religious studies at Indiana University Bloomington

Business and non-profit
 Peter Altabef (1983), president, CEO, and chairman of Unisys
 Michael Alter, president of the Alter Group and principal owner and chairman of WNBA team Chicago Sky (2005–present)
 Cyrus Amir-Mokri (1995), general counsel and managing director at JPMorgan Chase; also Assistant Secretary for Financial Institutions at the U.S. Treasury Department (2011–2014)
 Jeffrey Anderson (1992), executive vice president of Game Show Network (2017–present)
 Maggie Anderson (1998), CEO and co-founder of the Empowerment Experiment; also civil rights activist
 J. Calvin Brown, 70th president of the American Society of Mechanical Engineers (1951–1952)
 Debra Cafaro (1982), chairman and CEO of Ventas, Inc. (1999–present)
 Bradley M. Campbell (1986), president of Conservation Law Foundation
 Norton Clapp (1929), president and chairman of Weyerhaeuser (1960–1970) and president of Boy Scouts of America (1971–1973)
 Christopher DeMuth (1973), distinguished fellow at the Hudson Institute and president of the American Enterprise Institute (1986–2008)
 Daniel L. Doctoroff (1984), CEO and president of Bloomberg L.P. (2008–2014) and co-founder and CEO of Sidewalk Labs (2015–present)
 Daniel Fischel (1977), chairman and president of Compass Lexecon; also Lee and Brena Freeman Professor Emeritus of Law and Business and senior lecturer at the law school
 Paul D. Ginsberg (1987), president of Roark Capital Group
 James Goodale (1958), vice-president, general counsel and vice-chairman for The New York Times
 Gary Haugen (1991), founder, CEO, and former president of International Justice Mission
 Gene Healy (1999), vice-president of the Cato Institute and contributing editor to Liberty magazine
 Wayne Hsiung (2006), co-founder of animal rights network Direct Action Everywhere
 Cary Kochman (1990), co-head of Global Mergers and Acquisitions Group at Citigroup
 Peter Kurer (LL.M. 1976), chairman of UBS (2008–2009) and of Sunrise Communications AG (2016–2020)
 Luis Kutner (1927), co-founder of Amnesty International and inventor of the living will
 Glen Lewy (1974), senior managing director of Hudson Ventures
Ralph Neas (1971), executive director of the Leadership Conference on Civil and Human Rights, president and CEO of People For the American Way, president and CEO of the National Coalition on Health Care, and president and CEO of the Generic Pharmaceutical Association
 Robert Peach (did not graduate), founder of Mohawk Airlines
 Matthew Prince (2000), co-founder and CEO of Cloudflare
 Donald Pritzker (1959), entrepreneur and president of Hyatt Hotels Corporation 
 Nicholas J. Pritzker (1974), chairman and CEO of the Hyatt Development Corporation
 Thomas Pritzker (1978), executive chairman of Hyatt Hotels Corporation
 Marcus Raskin (1957), co-founder of the Institute for Policy Studies; also professor at George Washington University
 Andrew M. Rosenfield (1978), CEO and managing partner of TGG Group and managing partner of Guggenheim Partners
 David M. Rubenstein (1973), billionaire and founder of the Carlyle Group
 David O. Sacks (1998), founding COO and product leader at PayPal, founder and CEO of Yammer, and founder and partner of Craft Ventures (2017–present)
 Adam Silver (1988), 5th commissioner of the National Basketball Association (2014–present)
 James A. Squires (1992), president and CEO of Norfolk Southern Railway (2013–present)
 Paul Toback, CEO and chairman of Bally Total Fitness (2002–2006)
 Gordon Tullock (1947), professor of law at George Mason University School of Law and leading scholar of law and public choice theory
 Bradley Tusk (1999), founder and CEO of Tusk Holdings; also campaign manager for New York City Mayor Michael Bloomberg's successful 2009 re-election bid, Deputy Governor of Illinois (2003–2009), and communications director for U.S. Senator Chuck Schumer (2000–2002)
 David Wendell Phillips (1988), angel investor in Silicon Valley, CEO of Crunch Music and CEO and founder of NaturalPath Media 
 Joseph T. Zoline, founder and developer of Telluride Ski Resort
 Barry Zubrow (1980), former Chief Administrative Officer of Goldman Sachs, former Chief Risk Officer of JPMorgan Chase and Darelyn A. & Richard C. Reed Lecturer in Law at the law school

Writing

 Mitchell Dawson (1913), writer and poet
 Julian Dibbell (2014), author on social systems in online communities, and technology journalist
 Larry Downes (1993), author on business strategies and information technology, and internet industry analyst 
 Steve Fiffer (1976), author of Three Quarters, Two Dimes, and a Nickel and Guggenheim Fellow
 David Fromkin (1953), author of A Peace to End All Peace; also professor of history and international relations at Boston University
 Alan Gordon (1984), author of historical mysteries
 Claire Hartfield (1982), author of history-inspired novels and winner of Coretta Scott King Award (2019)
 Gini Hartzmark, author of thriller novels
 Linda Hirshman (1969), author on women's rights
 Anna Ivey (1997), author and graduate schools admission counselor
 Ernest Samuels (1926), biographer and winner of Pulitzer Prize for Biography or Autobiography (1965); also professor of English at Northwestern University
 Spencer Short (2007), poet; also attorney at Skadden, Arps, Slate, Meagher & Flom
 Studs Terkel (1934), author and winner of Pulitzer Prize for General Non-Fiction (1985)
 James Thayer (1974), author of thriller novels

Media and journalism
 Jan Crawford (1993), political correspondent and chief legal correspondent for CBS News and commentator on the U.S. Supreme Court
 Josh Hammer (2016), opinion editor for Newsweek
 Seymour Hersh (did not graduate), journalist, winner of Pulitzer Prize for International Reporting (1970), of the National Magazine Award (2004–2005), of the Orwell Award (2004), and of the George Polk Award (1969, 1973–1974, and 1981)
 Harvey Levin (1975), founder of TMZ
 Nell Minow (1977), film critic and corporate governance expert
 Mary Nissenson (1977), journalist (1982–1985) for NBC News and reporter for WBBM-TV in Chicago (1987–1988); also the first female president of the law students' association at the law school
 Andrew Patner (did not graduate), journalist for The Wall Street Journal and the Chicago Sun-Times
 William Schaap (1964), co-founder of CovertAction Quarterly

Art, music, and film
 James Steven Ginsburg (did not graduate), music producer, founder and president of Cedille Records, and son of U.S. Supreme Court Justice Ruth Bader Ginsburg
 Eric Gurry (1992), actor, best known for his roles in such films and plays as Bad Boys, Author! Author! and The Floating Light Bulb
 Judith Weinshall Liberman (1954), artist and creator of the Holocaust Wall Hangings
 J. Louis von der Mehden (1927), cellist, conductor and composer of classical music
 Miles Mogulescu (1984), film producer, including of Union Maids and of Montana
 Gabrielle Rolin (1960), Belgian film critic and novelist

Activism
 Morris B. Abram (1940), civil rights activist and attorney; also president of Brandeis University (1968–1970)
 Maggie Anderson (1998), activist and CEO and co-founder of the Empowerment Experiment
 Sophonisba Breckinridge (1904), activist, Progressive Era social reformer, and the first woman to graduate from the law school
 Earl B. Dickerson (1920), prominent attorney and community activist and first African-American graduate of the law school
 Nancy Feldman (1946), civil rights activist; also professor of sociology at the University of Tulsa
 Irene McCoy Gaines (1918), civil rights activist and anti-segregation campaigner
 Truman Gibson (1935), civil rights activist and influential boxing promoter
 Staughton Lynd (1976), prominent civil rights activist; also professor at Yale University
 Carol Ruth Silver (1964), civil rights activist and Freedom Rider; also member of San Francisco Board of Supervisors (1978–1980)

Sport
 Eric Friedler (1983), professional tennis player (1976–1980)
 Courtney Hall (2003), professional football player for the San Diego Chargers (1989–1996)
 Brooks Johnson, track athlete and coach and gold medallist at the 1963 Pan American Games
 Milton McManaway, college football player for the Furman Paladins in South Carolina (1919–1921)
 Francis Neate (1963), English cricketer (1958–1979); also president of the International Bar Association (2005–2006)
 Steven Segaloff (2000), U.S. Olympic rower and cox; also partner of Cravath, Swaine and Moore
Colin Milner Smith, English cricketer (1958); also commercial barrister and circuit judge (1991–2009)
 Jim Tanner (1993), sports and entertainment agent
 John F. Tobin (1906), American college football player for the Chicago Maroons and the Nebraska Cornhuskers and coach of Tulane Green Wave

Other

 Albert E. Bowen (1911), member of the Quorum of the Twelve Apostles (LDS Church)
 Joanne Lee Molinaro, attorney and food blogger known as the Korean Vegan
 Kameron Leigh Matthews (2006), physician
 Dallin H. Oaks (1957), First Counselor in the First Presidency (LDS Church) (2018–present); also president of Brigham Young University (1971–1980)
 Nirav D. Shah (2007), epidemiologist and economist
 Robert Yellowtail, leader of the Crow people and first Native American to hold the post of Agency Superintendent at an Indian reservation

References 

 
University of Chicago Law School
University of Chicago Law School alumni
University of Chicago Law School alumni